Lift Every Voice is an album by the American jazz trumpeter Malachi Thompson recorded and released by the Delmark label in 1983.

Reception

Allmusic reviewer Ron Wynn stated "Malachi Thompson merges hard bop, free, African rhythms, and gospel stylings on this release. ... Thompson deserves high praise not just for trying something different, but succeeding".

Track listing
All compositions by Malachi Thompson except where noted
 "Elephantine Island" – 3:44
 "Old Man River" (Jerome Kern, Oscar Hammerstein II) – 12:18
 "Tales of Ancient Kemet" – 7:49
 "Transition" (John Coltrane) – 6:23
 "Lift Ev'ry Voice and Sing" (James Weldon Johnson, John Rosamond Johnson) – 10:37
 "Nubian Call" – 5:40
 "The Trick of the Trip" – 4:13
 "Nobody Knows the Trouble I've Seen" (Traditional) – 10:29

Personnel
Malachi Thompson – trumpet, conch, steer horn
Bob Griffin, David Spencer, Elmer Brown, Kenny Anderson – trumpet
Bill McFarland, Edwin Williams, Ray Ripperton – trombone
Steve Berry – bass trombone
Carter Jefferson – tenor saxophone
Kirk Brown – piano 
Harrison Bankhead – bass
Avreeayl Ra – drums 
Enoch, Richard Lawrence – percussion
A.T. Crawford, Dee Dee McCall, James Spinks, Louise Thompson, Patsy Mullins, Rita Warford, Theo Reed, Valerie Mullins – vocals (track 5)

References

Delmark Records albums
1993 albums
Malachi Thompson albums
Albums produced by Bob Koester